Landsmanschaft could refer to:

 Landsmanshaft, a Jewish organisation
 Landsmannschaft (Studentenverbindung), a German students' fraternity
 Organizations of German refugees from former eastern territories
 Landsmannschaft Schlesien
 Landsmannschaft Ostpreußen
 Landsmannschaft Westpreußen
 Landsmannschaft der Deutschen aus Ungarn
 Landsmannschaft der Siebenbürger Sachsen in Deutschland
 Landsmannschaft der Deutschen aus Litauen
 Sudetendeutsche Landsmannschaft
 Deutsch-Baltische Gesellschaft